Robert Gregory (1727 – 1 September 1810) was a British East India merchant and  politician who sat in the British House of Commons from 1768 to 1784.

Gregory was the only son of Henry Gregory of Galway and his wife Mary Shawe. He went to India where he served with Honourable East India Company and made a considerable fortune. In 1766 he returned from India and settled in Kent. In 1768, he acquired the Coole Park estate of 8,000 acres near Gort in County Galway in Ireland and built a house there.

Gregory was a Member of Parliament (MP) for Maidstone from 18 March 1768 – 8 October 1774. He was then MP for Rochester, Kent from 7 October 1774 to 1 April 1784. He was also a director of the East India Company between 1769 and 1782 and then chairman briefly before he retired through ill-health.

Gregory married Maria Auchmuty, daughter of an official of the East India Company, and they had three sons. Of these, William Gregory was civil Under-Secretary for Ireland from 1812 to 1830 and was the father of another Robert Gregory, who died in 1847 from a disease he contracted ministering to his sick tenants in the Great Famine. He in turn was the father of William Henry Gregory.

References

1729 births
1810 deaths
People from Maidstone
People from Rochester, Kent
British MPs 1768–1774
British MPs 1774–1780
British MPs 1780–1784
Members of the Parliament of Great Britain for English constituencies
Directors of the British East India Company